The Nyonga forest tree frog (Leptopelis lebeaui) is a species of frog in the family Arthroleptidae endemic to the Democratic Republic of the Congo.
Its natural habitats are rivers, freshwater marshes, and intermittent freshwater marshes. As of 2004, the Upemba National Park was the only place in which they were being protected.

Conservation status
The conservation status of the Nyonga forest tree frog is currently data deficient, meaning not enough  information is available for a proper assessment of its conservation status.

References

Data Deficient

Leptopelis
Frogs of Africa
Endemic fauna of the Democratic Republic of the Congo
Amphibians of the Democratic Republic of the Congo
Upemba National Park
Taxonomy articles created by Polbot
Amphibians described in 1933